Estuardo Ernesto Galdámez Juárez (born 9 February 1966) is a former Guatemalan politician and military officer, and presidential candidate. Galdámez assumed the position of a deputy in the Congress of the Republic of Guatemala on January 14, 2012, and was reelected twice, leaving office on January 14, 2020. He was the then-ruling National Convergence Front (FCN) party's nominee in the 2019 Presidential election. After Galdámez left office, a warrant was issued for his arrest on charges of corruption. He was also stripped of immunity from prosecution, which forced him to miss the special transition session in Congress.

References

Living people
Guatemalan politicians
1966 births